Uma Devi Pemmaraju (31 March 1958 – 8 August 2022) was an Indian-American journalist and television anchor. She was one of the original hosts on the Fox News cable network at their 1996 premiere. Pemmaraju, who was born in India and raised in San Antonio, Texas, was a host/anchor of "America's News Headquarters w/Uma Pemmaraju" for the Fox News in New York. She also reported for Bloomberg News.

Early life
Pemmaraju was born in Rajahmundry, Andhra Pradesh, India, and grew up in San Antonio, Texas, United States. She graduated from Trinity University in Texas with a Bachelor of Arts degree in political science.

Career

Pemmaraju's early television career started in her home state of Texas at KENS-TV and the San Antonio Express-News newspaper as a producer and reporter while keeping a full-time load in college at Trinity University. She also served as the editor of her college newspaper. She next moved to KTVT-11 in Dallas, as a news anchor and correspondent and then to WMAR-TV in Baltimore where she won an Emmy. From Baltimore, she went to WLVI and WBZ-TV in Boston where she was a correspondent and a tipster/producer for WBZ's Evening Magazine.

Pemmaraju was part of the original Fox News team when the network launched in October 1996. She has hosted many different news shows on the network and has hosted a number of specials. She has interviewed high-profile newsmakers from the Dalai Lama to astronaut Buzz Aldrin, Joel Osteen, Carly Simon, Donald Trump, Whoopi Goldberg, Sarah Palin, along with a host of senators and congressional leaders from D.C. In addition to being coined as "Boston's Best Anchor" in 1996 and 1997 by Boston magazine, Pemmaraju has received numerous Emmy awards for her reporting and investigative journalism. Other honors throughout her career include: the Texas AP Award for reporting, The Woman of Achievement Award from the Big Sisters Organization of America and the Matrix Award from Women in Communications. She also attended American University studying international relations for one year as part of an exchange program with Trinity.

Death
Pemmaraju died on 8 August 2022, at her home in Ossining, New York. A cause of death was not released.

References

External links 

1958 births
2022 deaths
Indian emigrants to the United States
American Hindus
Harvard Kennedy School staff
Television anchors from Boston
People from San Antonio
Fox News people
People from Rajahmundry
American writers of Indian descent
Journalists from Andhra Pradesh
Journalists from Texas
Trinity University (Texas) alumni
African-American women journalists
Television anchors from Baltimore
American women television journalists
21st-century American women